The 1981 Copa Libertadores was won by Flamengo of Brazil, who beat Cobreloa of Chile in the finals.

Group stage
Nacional received a bye to the second round as 1980 title holders.

Group 1

Group 2

Group 3

Group 4

Group 5

Semi-finals

Group A

Group B

Finals

Man of the Match:
  Zico

Assistant referees:
  Juan Cardelino
  Ramón Barreto

References

External links
  CONMEBOL Official Website: 1981 Copa Libertadores
 RSSSF: Copa Libertadores 1981
 Ficha do Jogo - Matches Report

1
Copa Libertadores seasons
CR Flamengo